Shpagino is a rural locality (a selo) in Novomonoshkinsky Selsoviet, Zarinsky District, Altai Krai, Russia. The population was 118 as of 2013. There are 7 streets.

Geography 
Shpagino is located 41 km southwest of Zarinsk (the district's administrative centre) by road. Novomonoshkino is the nearest rural locality.

References 

Rural localities in Zarinsky District